Graham Lindsey Skaluba (born May 20, 1978) is an American singer, songwriter, and musician born and raised in Madison, Wisconsin. He played in several punk bands, including Old Skull,  while still in high-school. He released his first solo album in 2003. While retaining the punk attitude and political awareness Lindsey's music had since evolved and exposed his folk and country roots, to create a mix of folk, alternative country, Americana & country noir. He has since released two more albums, one EP and contributed to several compilations. Four of Lindsey's songs were used in the direct-to-DVD film Fairview St., released in 2010. His song "Emma Rumble" was used in the direct-to-DVD film Dunsmore, released in 2004. Lindsey lives in Montana and performs with his wife Tina Lindsey.

History
Lindsey left home at age fourteen and resided in New Orleans, Brooklyn, and Nebraska.
After the dissolution of Old Skull, Lindsey became interested in acoustic music, particularly the burgeoning anti-folk movement, and began playing local gigs in Madison. He then dropped music altogether for four years.

Discography

Solo albums
 Famous Anonymous Wilderness (September 2, 2003)
 Hell Under The Skullbones (August 15, 2006)
 We Are All Alone In This Together (January 20, 2009)
 The Mine EP (January 20, 2009)
 Digging Up Birds: A Collection of Rarities & Others (May 27, 2014)

Guest Appearances & Side Projects
 The Perreze Farm - Songs For The Birds EP (May 25, 2009)
 Slackeye Slim - El Santo Grial: La Pistola Piadosa (2011)

Compilations
 Uncut Magazine's Tracks inspired by Bob Dylan (2004)
 Pop Culture Press CD Sampler (2004)
 Hit The Hay - Vol. 2 (2004)
 For A Decade Of Sin: 11 Years Of Bloodshot Records (2006)
 KVCU 1190 AM - 10th Anniversary CD Live Compilation (2008)
 OST Fairview St. (2009)
 Y'all Motherfuckers Need Justice: Free Uriah and Quentin (2010)
 Danielle Colby Presents: The Music of Farmageddon Records (2011)

References

External links
 
 

American alternative country singers
American country singer-songwriters
American folk guitarists
American male guitarists
American folk singers
American male singer-songwriters
American rock singers
Singers from Montana
Songwriters from Montana
Musicians from Madison, Wisconsin
Living people
1978 births
Guitarists from Wisconsin
Guitarists from Montana
21st-century American singers
21st-century American guitarists
21st-century American male singers
Singer-songwriters from Wisconsin